North Shore, an electoral district of the Legislative Assembly in the Australian state of New South Wales, has had two incarnations, the first from 1920 to 1927 as a five-member electorate, the second from 1981 to the present as a single-member electorate.


Members

Election results

Elections in the 2010s

2019

2017 by-election

2015

2011

Elections in the 2000s

2007

2003

Elections in the 1990s

1999

1995

1994 by-election

1991

Elections in the 1980s

1988 by-election

1988

1984

1981

1927 - 1981

Elections in the 1920s

1926 appointment
Alick Kay, who had been elected as an independent, resigned on 28 July 1926 to accept appointment to the Metropolitan Meat Board. Which party interest Kay supported was determined by the Clerk of the Assembly after considering the votes of the late member on any motion of censure. Kay had supported the Lang Government in votes of confidence in the Assembly, the clerk therefore declared Kay represented the interests of the Labor Party. Arthur Tonge had the most votes of the unsuccessful Labor candidates at the 1925 election and took his seat on 22 September 1926.

1925

1925 appointment
Arthur Cocks resigned on 14 February 1925 to accept appointment to the position of Agent-General for NSW in London. Between 1920 and 1927 the Legislative Assembly was elected using a form of proportional representation with multi-member seats and a single transferable vote (modified Hare-Clark). The Parliamentary Elections (Casual Vacancies) Act, provided that casual vacancies were filled by the next unsuccessful candidate "who represents the same party interest as the late member". As there were no unsuccessful  candidates, Cocks was replaced by another Nationalist member, Alfred Reid, who took his seat on 24 March 1925.

1922

1920

Notes

References

New South Wales state electoral results by district